Jalen Hood-Schifino (born June 19, 2003) is an American college basketball player for the Indiana Hoosiers of the Big Ten Conference. He previously played for Montverde Academy. Hood-Schifino was a consensus five-star recruit and ranked as the highest incoming Big Ten recruit for the class of 2022.

High school career
Hood-Schifino played for three different programs in high school. He began his prep career at Northside Christian Academy in Charlotte, North Carolina. As a sophomore, Hood-Schifino played at Combine Academy in Lincolnton, North Carolina. Before his junior season, Hood-Schifino transferred to national powerhouse Montverde Academy in Florida, coached by Kevin Boyle. At Montverde, Hood-Schifino won back-to-back GEICO High School Basketball National titles (2021 and 2022). 

Hood-Schifino was named an all-star and invited to play in the Jordan Brand Classic, where he scored 14 points and hit three three-point shots. In the off-season prior to college he also played for coach Norton Hurd IV and Team Thad, an AAU program founded by NBA player Thaddeus Young. He spent time working out in California with professionals, including the Los Angeles Clippers’ Paul George.

Hood-Schifino stated that his time at Montverde prepared him for college basketball, noting, "The everyday grind at Montverde, people don’t really know what’s, you know, put into it, like the practices. It's almost like a college practice; you're practicing three-plus hours every day, so it really prepared me for now. . . Now going through college, it’s almost like I’m at Montverde but at a college level."

Recruiting
While playing at the Combine Academy, Hood-Schifino committed to play for Jeff Capel and Pittsburgh. At the time, it was considered a major recruiting win for the Panthers to land Hood-Schifino, a Pittsburgh native. But following Hood-Schifino's sophomore year in high school, he chose to reopen his recruitment. The Indiana Hoosiers became involved in Hood-Schifino’s recruitment in the summer of 2021, just months after head coach Mike Woodson began in Bloomington. Hood-Schifino committed to the Hoosiers in August of 2021. He was the highest-rated recruit to sign with the Hoosiers since Romeo Langford in 2018 and the 9th highest-ranked recruit for the program since 1998.

College career

Prior to Hood-Schifino's freshman year with the Hoosiers, the 2022–23 season, a mock NBA draft projected him as a first-round pick. A panel of Big Ten media named him the preseason freshman of the year in the league.

Career statistics

College

Personal life
Hood-Schifino is the son of Glenn Hood and Adrianne "Angel" Hood-Schifino. The family was originally in Pittsburgh, but moved to Charlotte while Hood-Schifino was in middle school. Growing up, he played basketball in his grandparents’ backyard and played against his older cousins, Sherron and DeAndre Schifino. DeAndre would end up being a member of the University of Pittsburgh’s football team. Sherron Schifino would end up playing college basketball. Sherron and DeAndre Schifino’s friends — who were also older than Hood-Schifino — played with them, too. "I was always the young kid," Hood-Schifino later explained. 

As part of a student athlete compensation package to raise awareness for Indiana charity partners, Hood-Schifino endorsed Big Brothers Big Sisters of Central Indiana, offering in-person appearances (such as speaking, presentation of skills, autograph sessions, and the like) as well as social media posts promoting these appearances and the charity.

References

External links
Indiana Hoosiers bio

2003 births
Living people
American men's basketball players
Basketball players from Pittsburgh
Indiana Hoosiers men's basketball players
Point guards